Nubeoscincus stellaris is a species of skink found in Papua New Guinea.

References

Nubeoscincus
Reptiles described in 2005
Reptiles of Papua New Guinea
Endemic fauna of Papua New Guinea
Taxa named by Allen Eddy Greer
Taxa named by Allen Allison
Taxa named by Harold Cogger
Skinks of New Guinea